Marlene Infante (born 21 December 1952) is a Cuban fencer. She competed in the women's individual and team foil events at the 1972 Summer Olympics.

References

1952 births
Living people
Cuban female foil fencers
Olympic fencers of Cuba
Fencers at the 1972 Summer Olympics
Pan American Games medalists in fencing
Pan American Games silver medalists for Cuba
Fencers at the 1971 Pan American Games
20th-century Cuban women
21st-century Cuban women